Markus Happe (born 11 February 1972 in Münster) is a German former professional footballer who played as a defender.

Honours
Bayer Leverkusen
 DFB-Pokal: 1992–93

Schalke 04
 DFB-Pokal: 2000–01, 2001–02

References

External links
 

1972 births
Living people
Association football defenders
German footballers
Germany under-21 international footballers
SC Preußen Münster players
Bayer 04 Leverkusen players
Bayer 04 Leverkusen II players
FC Schalke 04 players
1. FC Köln players
Kickers Offenbach players
Bundesliga players
2. Bundesliga players
Sportspeople from Münster
Footballers from North Rhine-Westphalia
West German footballers